The 2019 Colorado Rockies season was the franchise's 27th in Major League Baseball. It was their 25th season at Coors Field. Bud Black returned as Manager for his 3rd season in 2019. Before the season began Black was officially offered a 3-year contract extension deal that would see him remain Manager till the 2022 season. After making the playoffs the previous two seasons, the Rockies were eliminated from postseason contention on September 12.

Offseason
December 21, 2018: Daniel Murphy was signed as a free agent by the Colorado Rockies.

Regular season

Season standings

National League West

National League Wild Card

Record vs. opponents

Transactions
June 21, 2019: Mike Dunn was released by the Colorado Rockies.
July 26, 2019: Mark Reynolds and Seung-hwan Oh were released by the Colorado Rockies.
August 15, 2019: Chris Iannetta was released by the Colorado Rockies

Major League Debuts
Batters
Josh Fuentes (April 6)
Yonathan Daza (April 9)
Brendan Rodgers (May 17)
Dom Nunez (August 13)
Sam Hilliard (August 27)
Pitchers
Jesús Tinoco (May 31)
Peter Lambert (June 6)
Phillip Diehl (June 11)
Rico Garcia (August 27)

Game log 

|- bgcolor="ffbbbb"
|- align="center" bgcolor="bbffbb"
| 1 || March 28 || @ Marlins || 6–3 || Freeland (1–0) || Ureña (0–1) || || 25,423 || 1–0 || W1
|- align="center" bgcolor="bbffbb"
| 2 || March 29 || @ Marlins || 6–1 || Márquez (1–0) || Conley (0–1) || || 6,503 || 2–0 || W2
|- align="center" bgcolor="ffbbbb"
| 3 || March 30 || @ Marlins || 7–3 || López (1–0) || Anderson (0–1) || || 7,642 || 2–1 || L1
|- align="center" bgcolor="ffbbbb"
| 4 || March 31 || @ Marlins || 3–0 || Alcántara (1–0) || Gray (0–1) || Romo (1) || 7,559 || 2–2 || L2
|-

|- bgcolor="ffbbbb"
|- align="center" bgcolor="ffbbbb"
| 5 || April 1 || @ Rays || 7–1 || Yarbrough (1–0) || Bettis (0–1) || || 10,860 || 2–3 || L3
|- align="center" bgcolor="ffbbbb"
| 6 || April 2 || @ Rays || 4–0 || Snell (1–1) || Freeland (1–1) || || 10,933 || 2–4 || L4
|- align="center" bgcolor="bbffbb"
| 7 || April 3 || @ Rays || 1–0 (11) || Davis (1–0) || Roe (0–1) || || 11,093 || 3–4 || W1
|- align="center" bgcolor="ffbbbb"
| 8 || April 5 || Dodgers || 10–6 || Maeda (2–0) || Anderson (0–2) || || 48,404 || 3–5 || L1
|- align="center" bgcolor="ffbbbb"
| 9 || April 6 || Dodgers || 7–2 || Buehler (1–0) || Gray (0–2) || Jansen (4) || 47,880 || 3–6 || L2
|- align="center" bgcolor="ffbbbb"
| 10 || April 7 || Dodgers || 12–6 || Kelly (1–1) || Bettis (0–2) || || 41,232 || 3–7 || L3
|- align="center" bgcolor="ffbbbb"
| 11 || April 8 || Braves || 8–6 || Teherán (1–1) || Freeland (1–2) || Minter (1) || 25,199 || 3–8 || L4
|- align="center" bgcolor="ffbbbb"
| 12 || April 9 || Braves || 7–1 || Fried (2–0) || Márquez (1–1) || || 26,124 || 3–9 || L5
|- align="center" bgcolor=bbbbbb
| – || April 10 || Braves || PPD || Makeup Aug. 26 || || || || ||
|- align="center" bgcolor=ffbbbb
| 13 || April 11 || @ Giants || 0–1 || Samardzija (1–0) || Gray (0–3) || || 33,616 || 3–10 || L6
|- align="center" bgcolor=ffbbbb
| 14 || April 12 || @ Giants || 2–3 (18) || Bergen (2–0) || Johnson (0–1) || || 33,616 || 3–11 || L7
|- align="center" bgcolor=ffbbbb
| 15 || April 13 || @ Giants || 5–3 || Bumgarner (1–2) || Freeland (1–3) || Dyson (1) || 32,607 || 3–12 || L8
|- align="center" bgcolor="bbffbb"
| 16 || April 14 || @ Giants || 4–0 || Márquez (2–1) || Holland (1–2) || || 35,513 || 4–12 || W1
|- align="center" bgcolor=bbffbb
| 17 || April 15 || @ Padres || 5–2 || Senzatela (1–0) || Lucchesi (2–2)  ||  Davis (1) || 24,867 || 5–12 || W2
|- align="center" bgcolor="bbffbb"
| 18 || April 16 || @ Padres || 8–2 || Gray (1–3) || Margevicius (1–2) || || 24,963 || 6–12 || W3
|- align="center" bgcolor="bbffbb"
| 19 || April 18 || Phillies || 6–2 || Freeland (2–3) || Eflin (2–2) || || 27,562 || 7–12 || W4
|- align="center" bgcolor="bbffbb"
| 20 || April 19 || Phillies || 4–3 (12) || Bettis (1–2) || Nicasio (0–1) || || 35,423 || 8–12 || W5
|- align="center" bgcolor="ffbbbb"
| 21 || April 20 || Phillies || 8–5 || Nola (2–0) || Senzatela (1–1) || Neris (3) || 40,530 || 8–13 || L1
|- align="center" bgcolor="bbffbb"
| 22 || April 21 || Phillies || 4–1 || Gray (2–3) || Eickhoff (0–1) || || 28,287 || 9–13 || W1
|- align="center" bgcolor="bbffbb"
| 23 || April 22 || Nationals || 7–5 || Oh (1–0) || Suero (1–2) || Davis (2) || 20,517 || 10–13 || W2
|- align="center" bgcolor="ffbbbb"
| 24 || April 23 || Nationals || 3–6 || Corbin (2–0) || Hoffman (0–1) || Doolittle (3) || 24,456 || 10–14 || L1
|- align="center" bgcolor="bbffbb"
| 25 || April 24 || Nationals || 9–5 || Márquez (3–1) || Sánchez (0–3) || Davis (3) || 33,135 || 11–14 || W1
|- align="center" bgcolor="bbffbb"
| 26 || April 26 || @ Braves || 8–4 || Senzatela (2–1) || Fried (3–1) || Davis (4) || 40,282 || 12–14 || W2
|- align="center" bgcolor="bbffbb"
| 27 || April 27 || @ Braves || 9–5 || Shaw (1–0) || Minter (0–3) || || 38,243 || 13–14 || W3
|- align="center" bgcolor="ffbbbb"
| 28 || April 28 || @ Braves || 8–7 || Webb (1–0) || Oh (1–1) || Jackson (1) || 33,919 || 13–15 || L1
|- align="center" bgcolor="ffbbbb"
| 29 || April 29 || @ Brewers || 5–1 || Davies (3–0) || Freeland (2–4) || || 23,356 || 13–16 || L2
|- align="center" bgcolor="ffbbbb"
| 30 || April 30 || @ Brewers || 4–3 || Chacín (3–3) || Márquez (3–2) || Hader (7) || 25,673 || 13–17 || L3
|-

|- align="center" bgcolor="bbffbb"
| 31 || May 1 || @ Brewers || 11–4 || Estévez (1–0) || Burnes (0–3) || || 28,780 || 14–17 || W1
|- align="center" bgcolor="bbffbb"
| 32 || May 2 || @ Brewers || 11–6 || Gray (3–3) || Peralta (1–1) || || 21,319 || 15–17 || W2
|- align="center" bgcolor="ffbbbb"
| 33 || May 3 || Diamondbacks || 10–9 || Ray (2–1) || Anderson (0–3) || Holland (8) || 29,574 || 15–18 || L1
|- align="center" bgcolor="ffbbbb"
| 34 || May 4 || Diamondbacks || 9–2 || Weaver (3–1) || Freeland (2–5) || || 37,765 || 15–19 || L2
|- align="center" bgcolor="bbffbb"
| 35 || May 5 || Diamondbacks || 8–7 || Oberg (1–0) || Bradley (1–3) || Davis (5) || 40,262 || 16–19 || W1
|- align="center" bgcolor="ffbbbb"
| 36 || May 7 || Giants || 14–4 || Bumgarner (2–4) || Senzatela (2–2) || || 21,707 || 16–20 || L1
|- align="center" bgcolor=bbbbbb
| – || May 8 || Giants || PPD || || || || || ||
|- align="center" bgcolor="bbffbb"
| 37 || May 9 || Giants || 12–11 || Shaw (2–0) || Beede (0–1) || Davis (6) || 25,368 || 17–20 || W1
|- align="center" bgcolor="bbffbb"
| 38 || May 10 || Padres || 12–2 || Márquez (4–2) || Lauer (2–4) || || 27,594 || 18–20 || W2
|- align="center" bgcolor="ffbbbb"
| 39 || May 11 || Padres || 4–3 || Stammen (4–1) || Davis (1–1) || Yates (16) || 37,118 || 18–21 || L1
|- align="center" bgcolor="bbffbb"
| 40 || May 12 || Padres || 10–7 || Senzatela (3–2) || Margevicius (2–4) || || 40,234 || 19–21 || W1
|- align="center" bgcolor="bbffbb"
| 41 || May 14 || @ Red Sox || 5–4 (11) || Dunn (1–0) || Brasier (2–2) || Davis (7) || 35,804 || 20–21 || W2
|- align="center" bgcolor="ffbbbb"
| 42 || May 15 || @ Red Sox || 6–5 (10) || Workman (3–1) || Bettis (1–3) || || 37,032 || 20–22 || L1
|- align="center" bgcolor="ffbbbb"
| 43 || May 17 || @ Phillies || 5–4 || Irvin (2–0) || Gray (3–4) || Neris (6) || 28,079 || 20–23 || L2
|- align="center" bgcolor="ffbbbb"
| 44 || May 18 || @ Phillies || 2–1 || Nola (4–0) || Senzatela (3–3) || Neris (7) || 42,354 || 20–24 || L3
|- align="center" bgcolor="ffbbbb"
| 45 || May 19 || @ Phillies || 7–5 || García (1–0) || Shaw (2–1) || Neshek (3) || 38,603 || 20–25 || L4
|- align="center" bgcolor="bbffbb"
| 46 || May 21 || @ Pirates || 5–0 || Márquez (5–2) || Archer (1–4) || || 12,265 || 21–25 || W1
|- align="center" bgcolor="bbffbb"
| 47 || May 22 || @ Pirates || 9–3 || Gray (4–4) || DuRapau (0–1) || || 9,534 || 22–25 || W2
|- align="center" bgcolor="ffbbbb"
| 48 || May 23 || @ Pirates || 14–6 || Lyles (5–1) || Senzatela (3–4) || || 15,490 || 22–26 || L1
|- align="center" bgcolor="bbffbb"
| 49 || May 24 || Orioles || 8–6 || Oberg (2–0) || Givens (0–3) || || 32,397 || 23–26 || W1
|- align="center" bgcolor="ffbbbb"
| 50 || May 25 || Orioles || 6–8 || Cashner (5–2) || Freeland (2–6) || Lucas (1) || 41,239 || 23–27 || L1
|- align="center" bgcolor="bbffbb"
| 51 || May 26 || Orioles || 8–7 || Oberg (3–0) || Fry (0–2) || || 46,815 || 24–27 || W1
|- align="center" bgcolor="bbffbb"
| 52 || May 27 || Diamondbacks || 4–3 (11) || Oh (2–1) || Andriese (3–3) || || 35,604 || 25–27 || W2
|- align="center" bgcolor="bbffbb"
| 53 || May 28 || Diamondbacks || 6–2 || Díaz (1–0) || Kelly (4–6) || Bettis (1) || 21,583 || 26–27 || W3
|- align="center" bgcolor="bbffbb"
| 54 || May 29 || Diamondbacks || 5–4 || Hoffman (1–1) || Ray (4–2) || Oberg (1) || 24,261 || 27–27  || W4
|- align="center" bgcolor="bbffbb"
| 55 || May 30 || Diamondbacks || 11–10 (10) || Oh (3–1) || Hirano (1–3) || || 30,371 || 28–27 || W5
|- align="center" bgcolor="bbffbb"
| 56 || May 31 || Blue Jays || 13–6 || Márquez (6–2) || Jackson (0–3) || || 32,990 || 29–27 || W6
|-

|- align="center" bgcolor="bbffbb"
| 57 || June 1 || Blue Jays || 4–2 || Gray (5–4) || Stroman (3–7) || Oberg (2) || 34,025 || 30–27 || W7
|- align="center" bgcolor="bbffbb"
| 58 || June 2 || Blue Jays || 5–1 || Senzatela (4–4) || Sanchez (3–6) || || 37,861 || 31–27 || W8
|- align="center" bgcolor="ffbbbb"
| 59 || June 4 || @ Cubs || 3–6 || Hendricks (6–4) || Hoffman (1–2) || Strop (5) || 36,753 || 31–28 || L1
|- align="center" bgcolor="ffbbbb"
| 60 || June 5 || @ Cubs || 8–9 || Kintzler (2–0) || Márquez (6–3) || Cishek (6) || 35,395 || 31–29 || L2
|- align="center" bgcolor="bbffbb"
| 61 || June 6 || @ Cubs || 3–1 || Lambert (1–0) || Quintana (4–5) || Oberg (3) || 36,375 || 32–29 || W1
|- align="center" bgcolor="bbffbb"
| 62 || June 7 || @ Mets || 5–1 || Senzatela (5–4) || deGrom (3–6) || || 27,520 || 33–29 || W2
|- align="center" bgcolor="ffbbbb"
| 63 || June 8 || @ Mets || 3–5 || Matz (5–4) || Gray (5–5) || Díaz (14) || 29,077 || 33–30 || L1
|- align="center" bgcolor="ffbbbb"
| 64 || June 9 || @ Mets || 1–6 || Syndergaard (4–4) || Hoffman (1–3) || || 29,531 || 33–31 || L2
|- align="center" bgcolor="bbffbb"
| 65 || June 10 || Cubs || 6–5 || Oberg (4–0) || Cishek (1–3) || Davis (8) || 44,859 || 34–31 || W1
|- align="center" bgcolor="bbffbb"
| 66 || June 11 || Cubs || 10–3 || Lambert (2–0) || Quintana (4–6) || || 43,126 || 35–31 || W2
|- align="center" bgcolor="ffbbbb"
| 67 || June 12 || Cubs || 1–10 || Hamels (6–2) || Senzatela (5–5) || || 47,412 || 35–32 || L1
|- align="center" bgcolor="bbffbb"
| 68 || June 13 || Padres || 9–6 ||  Gray (6–5) ||  Strahm (2–6) || || 35,504 || 36–32 || W1
|- align="center" bgcolor="ffbbbb"
| 69 || June 14 || Padres || 12–16 (12) || Stammen (5–3) || Díaz (1–1) || || 38,077 || 36–33 || L1
|- align="center" bgcolor="bbffbb"
| 70 || June 15 || Padres || 14–8 || Márquez (7–3) || Lauer (5–6) || || 46,133 || 37–33 || W1
|- align="center" bgcolor="ffbbbb"
| 71 || June 16 || Padres || 13–14 || Reyes (3–0) || Davis (1–2) || Yates (24) || 47,526 || 37–34 || L1
|- align="center" bgcolor="bbffbb"
| 72 || June 18 || @ Diamondbacks || 8–1 || Senzatela (6–5) || Kelly (7–7) || || 22,954 || 38–34 || W1
|- align="center" bgcolor="bbffbb"
| 73 || June 19 || @ Diamondbacks || 6–4 || Gray (7–5) || Greinke (8–3) || Davis (9) || 21,773 || 39–34 || W2
|- align="center" bgcolor="bbffbb"
| 74 || June 20 || @ Diamondbacks || 6–4 (10) || Oberg (5–0) || Hirano (3–4) || || 23,294 || 40–34 || W3
|- align="center" bgcolor="ffbbbb"
| 75 || June 21 || @ Dodgers || 2–4 || Buehler (8–1) || Díaz (1–2) || || 54,044 || 40–35 || L1
|- align="center" bgcolor="ffbbbb"
| 76 || June 22 || @ Dodgers || 4–5  || Kelly (2–3) || Tinoco (0–1) || || 53,096 || 40–36 || L2
|- align="center" bgcolor="ffbbbb"
| 77 || June 23 || @ Dodgers || 3–6 || Jansen (3–2) || Oberg (5–1) || || 50,023 || 40–37 || L3
|- align="center" bgcolor="bbffbb"
| 78 || June 24 || @ Giants || 2–0 || Gray (8–5) || Pomeranz (2–8) || Davis (10) || 30,018 || 41–37 || W1
|- align="center" bgcolor="ffbbbb"
| 79 || June 25 || @ Giants || 2–4 || Bumgarner (4–7) || Gonzalez (0–1) || Smith (21) || 31,458 || 41–38 || L1
|- align="center" bgcolor="bbffbb"
| 80 || June 26 || @ Giants || 6–3 || Márquez (8–3) || Samardzija (4–7) || Davis (11) || 33,765 || 42–38 || W1
|- align="center" bgcolor="ffbbbb"
| 81 || June 27 || Dodgers || 8–12 || Báez (3–2) || Davis (1–3) || || 47,452 || 42–39 || L1
|- align="center" bgcolor="bbffbb"
| 82 || June 28 || Dodgers || 13–9 || Senzatela (7–5) || Ryu (9–2) || || 46,065 || 43–39 || W1
|- align="center" bgcolor="bbffbb"
| 83 || June 29 || Dodgers || 5–3 || Gray (9–5) || Kershaw (7–2) || Davis (12) || 48,101 || 44–39 || W2
|- align="center" bgcolor="ffbbbb"
| 84 || June 30 || Dodgers || 5–10 || Floro (3–2) || Bettis (1–4) || || 47,713 || 44–40 || L1
|-

|- align="center" bgcolor="ffbbbb"
| 85 || July 2 || Astros || 8–9 || Harris (3–1) || McGee (0–1) || Osuna (18) || 47,864 || 44–41 || L2
|- align="center" bgcolor="ffbbbb"
| 86 || July 3 || Astros || 2–4 || Miley (7–4) || Lambert (2–1) || Osuna (19) || 48,308 || 44–42 || L3
|- align="center" bgcolor="ffbbbb"
| 87 || July 5 || @ Diamondbacks || 0–8 || Greinke (10–3) || Senzatela (7–6) || || 43,056 || 44–43 || L4
|- align="center" bgcolor="ffbbbb"
| 88 || July 6 || @ Diamondbacks || 2–4 || Ray (6–6) || Gray (9–6) || Holland (13) || 28,276 || 44–44 || L5
|- align="center" bgcolor="ffbbbb"
| 89 || July 7 || @ Diamondbacks || 3–5 || Young (2–0) || Márquez (8–4) || Holland (14) || 22,964 || 44–45 || L6
|- align="center" bgcolor=
|-style="text-align:center; background:#bbcaff;"
|colspan="10"|90th All-Star Game in Cleveland, Ohio
|- align="center" bgcolor="bbffbb"
| 90 || July 12 || Reds || 3–2 || Díaz (2–2) || Hernandez (2–5) || Davis (13) || 41,368 || 45–45 || W1
|- align="center" bgcolor="ffbbbb"
| 91 || July 13 || Reds || 9–17 || Hughes (3–2) || Bettis (1–5) || || 43,650 || 45–46 || L1
|- align="center" bgcolor="bbffbb"
| 92 || July 14 || Reds || 10–9 || Senzatela (8–6) || Mahle (2–10) || Davis (14) || 40,624 || 46–46 || W1
|- align="center" bgcolor="ffbbbb"
| 93 || July 15 (1) || Giants || 2–19 || Samardzija (7–7) || Márquez (8–5) || || 26,434 || 46–47 || L1
|- align="center" bgcolor="ffbbbb"
| 94 || July 15 (2) || Giants || 1–2 || Rodríguez (4–5) || Gonzalez (0–2) || Smith (24) || 34,424 || 46–48 || L2
|- align="center" bgcolor="ffbbbb"
| 95 || July 16 || Giants || 4–8  || Smith (3–0) || Davis (1–4) || || 47,413 || 46–49 || L3
|- align="center" bgcolor="ffbbbb"
| 96 || July 17 || Giants || 8–11 || Holland (2–4) || Gray (9–7) || Melancon (1) || 40,157 || 46–50 || L4
|- align="center" bgcolor="ffbbbb"
| 97 || July 19 || @ Yankees || 2–8 || Happ (8–5) || Freeland (2–7) || Tarpley (2) || 44,316 || 46–51 || L5
|- align="center" bgcolor="ffbbbb"
| 98 || July 20 || @ Yankees || 5–11 || Tanaka (7–5) || Senzatela (8–7) || || 41,499 || 46–52 || L6
|- align="center" bgcolor="bbffbb"
| 99 || July 21 || @ Yankees || 8–4 || Márquez (9–5) || Paxton (5–5) || || 41,841 || 47–52 || W1
|- align="center" bgcolor=bbbbbb
| – || July 22 || @ Nationals || colspan=7|Postponed (inclement weather); Rescheduled for July 24 as part of a doubleheader.
|- align="center" bgcolor="ffbbbb"
| 100 || July 23 || @ Nationals || 1–11 || Strasburg (13–4) || Lambert (2–2) || || 22,612 || 47–53 || L1
|- align="center" bgcolor="ffbbbb"
| 101 || July 24 (1) || @ Nationals || 2–3 || Suero (3–5) || Estévez (1–1) || Doolittle (22) || 14,628 || 47–54 || L2
|- align="center" bgcolor="ffbbbb"
| 102 || July 24 (2)|| @ Nationals || 0–2 || Corbin (8–5) || Freeland (2–8) || Doolittle (23) || 23,843 || 47–55 || L3
|- align="center" bgcolor="bbffbb"
| 103 || July 25 || @ Nationals || 8–7 || Díaz (3–2) || Rodney (0–4) || Davis (15) || 26,831 || 48–55 || W1
|- align="center" bgcolor="bbffbb"
| 104 || July 26 || @ Reds || 12–2 || Márquez (10–5) || Castillo (9–4) || || 23,045 || 49–55 || W2
|- align="center" bgcolor="ffbbbb"
| 105 || July 27 || @ Reds || 1–3 || DeSclafani (6–5) || Gonzalez (0–3) || Iglesias (18) || 25,115 || 49–56 || L1
|- align="center" bgcolor="ffbbbb"
| 106 || July 28 || @ Reds || 2–3 || Sims (2–1) || McGee (0–2) || Iglesias (19) || 19,649 || 49–57 || L2
|- align="center" bgcolor="bbffbb"
| 107 || July 29 || Dodgers || 9–1 || Gray (10–7) || Maeda (7–8) || || 43,574 || 50–57 || W1
|- align="center" bgcolor="ffbbbb"
| 108 || July 30 || Dodgers || 4–9 || Sadler (1–0) || Freeland (2–9) || Gonsolin (1) || 45,300 || 50–58 || L1
|- align="center" bgcolor="ffbbbb
| 109 || July 31 || Dodgers || 1–5 || Kelly (5–3) || Davis (1–5) || || 42,025 || 50–59 || L2
|-

|- align="center" bgcolor="bbffbb
| 110 || August 2 || Giants || 5–4 || Díaz (4–2) || Moronta (3–6) || Oberg (4) || 40,672 || 51–59 || W1
|- align="center" bgcolor="ffbbbb"
| 111 || August 3 || Giants || 5–6 || Coonrod (2–0) || Estévez (1–2) || Smith (27) || 47,540 || 51–60 || L1
|- align="center" bgcolor="bbffbb"
| 112 || August 4 || Giants || 6–2 || Freeland (3–9) || Beede (3–6) || || 40,084 || 52–60 || W1
|- align="center" bgcolor="ffbbbb"
| 113 || August 6 || @ Astros || 6–11 || Greinke (11–4) || Gonzalez (0–4) || || 43,243 || 52–61 || L1
|- align="center" bgcolor="ffbbbb"
| 114 || August 7 || @ Astros || 3–14 || Cole (14–5) || Lambert (2–3) ||  || 35,566 || 52–62 || L2
|- align="center" bgcolor="ffbbbb"
| 115 || August 8 || @ Padres || 3–9 || Strahm (5–8) || Gray (10–8) || || 27,806 || 52–63 || L3
|- align="center" bgcolor="ffbbbb"
| 116 || August 9 || @ Padres || 1–7 || Quantrill (5–3) || Freeland (3–10) || || 27,882 || 52–64 || L4
|- align="center" bgcolor="ffbbbb"
| 117 || August 10 || @ Padres || 5–8 || Muñoz (1–1) || Díaz (4–3) || Yates (33) || 42,564 || 52–65 || L5
|- align="center" bgcolor="bbffbb"
| 118 || August 11 || @ Padres || 8–3 || Márquez (11–5) || Stammen (6–6) || || 28,930 || 53–65 || W1
|- align="center" bgcolor="ffbbbb"
| 119 || August 12 || Diamondbacks || 6–8 || Kelly (8–12) || Bettis (1–6) || Bradley (4) || 32,160 || 53–66 || L1
|- align="center" bgcolor="ffbbbb"
| 120 || August 13 || Diamondbacks || 3–9 || Ginkel (1–0) || Hoffman (1–4) || || 31,815 || 53–67 || L2
|- align="center" bgcolor="bbffbb"
| 121 || August 14 || Diamondbacks || 7–6 || Oberg (6–1) || Bradley (3–5) || || 32,247 || 54–67 || W1
|- align="center" bgcolor="bbffbb"
| 122 || August 16 || Marlins || 3–0 || Gray (11–8) || Alcántara (4–11) || Oberg (5) || 35,018 || 55–67 || W2
|- align="center" bgcolor="bbffbb"
| 123 || August 17 || Marlins || 11–4 || Márquez (12–5) || Noesí (0–3) || || 40,199 || 56–67 || W3
|- align="center" bgcolor="bbffbb"
| 124 || August 18 || Marlins || 7–6 (10) || Estévez (2–2) || Brigham (2–2) || || 38,181 || 57–67 || W4
|- align="center" bgcolor="ffbbbb"
| 125 || August 19 || @ Diamondbacks || 3–5 || López (2–5) || Davis (1–6) || Bradley (5) || 15,443 || 57–68 || L1
|- align="center" bgcolor="ffbbbb"
| 126 || August 20 || @ Diamondbacks || 7–8 || Young (5–3) || Freeland (3–11) || Bradley (6) || 17,691 || 57–69 || L2
|- align="center" bgcolor="bbffbb"
| 127 || August 21 || @ Diamondbacks || 7–2 || Melville (1–0) || Leake (9–10) || || 17,707 || 58–69 || W1
|- align="center" bgcolor="ffbbbb"
| 128 || August 22 || @ Cardinals || 5–6 || Leone (1–0) || Almonte (0–1) || Martínez (15) || 36,465 || 58–70 || L1
|- align="center" bgcolor="ffbbbb"
| 129 || August 23 || @ Cardinals || 3–8 || Flaherty (8–6) || Lambert (2–4) || || 40,829 || 58–71 || L2
|- align="center" bgcolor="ffbbbb"
| 130 || August 24 || @ Cardinals || 0–6 || Hudson (13–6) || Gonzalez (0–5) || || 42,102 || 58–72 || L3
|- align="center" bgcolor="ffbbbb"
| 131 || August 25 || @ Cardinals || 4–11 || Helsley (1–0) || Senzatela (8–8) || || 45,551 || 58–73 || L4
|- align="center" bgcolor="bbffbb"
| 132 || August 26 || Braves || 3–1 || Díaz (5–3) || Swarzak (3–4) || || 29,803 || 59–73 || W1
|- align="center" bgcolor="ffbbbb"
| 133 || August 27 || Red Sox || 6–10 || Porcello (12–10) || Garcia (0–1) || || 44,101 || 59–74 || L1
|- align="center" bgcolor="ffbbbb"
| 134 || August 28 || Red Sox || 4–7 || Rodríguez (16–5) || Lambert (2–5) || Workman (9) || 40,801 || 59–75 || L2
|- align="center" bgcolor="ffbbbb"
| 135 || August 29 || Pirates || 8–11 || Williams (7–6) || Gonzalez (0–6) || Vázquez (24) || 33,408 || 59–76 || L3
|- align="center" bgcolor="ffbbbb"
| 136 || August 30 || Pirates || 4–9 || Agrazal (4–3) || Senzatela (8–9) || || 27,789 || 59–77 || L4
|- align="center" bgcolor="ffbbbb"
| 137 || August 31 || Pirates || 4–11 || Musgrove (9–12) || Melville (1–1) || || 37,293 || 59–78 || L5
|-

|- align="center" bgcolor="ffbbbb"
| 138 || September 1 || Pirates || 2–6 || Brault (4–3) || Hoffman (1–5) || — || 32,685 || 59–79 || L6
|- align="center" bgcolor="ffbbbb"
| 139 || September 2 || @ Dodgers || 9–16 || Buehler (12–3) || Lambert (2–6) || Maeda (1) || 45,910 || 59–80 || L7
|- align="center" bgcolor="ffbbbb"
| 140 || September 3 || @ Dodgers || 3–5 || Ferguson (1–1) || Shaw (2–2) || Jansen (28) || 52,231 || 59–81 || L8
|- align="center" bgcolor="ffbbbb"
| 141 || September 4 || @ Dodgers || 3–7 || Kolarek (6–3) || Senzatela (8–10) || || 45,761 || 59–82 || L9
|- align="center" bgcolor="bbffbb"
| 142 || September 6 || @ Padres || 3–2 || Melville (2–1) || Lamet (2–4) || Díaz (1) || 26,073 || 60–82 || W1
|- align="center" bgcolor="ffbbbb"
| 143 || September 7 || @ Padres || 0–3 || Lucchesi (10–7) || Hoffman (1–6) || Yates (40) || 29,709 || 60–83 || L1
|- align="center" bgcolor="ffbbbb"
| 144 || September 8 || @ Padres || 1–2 (10) || Stammen (8–7) || Tinoco (0–2) || || 26,834 || 60–84 || L2
|- align="center" bgcolor="bbffbb"
| 145 || September 10 || Cardinals || 2–1 || Gonzalez (1–6) || Wacha (6–7) || Díaz (2) || 31,514 || 61–84 || W1
|- align="center" bgcolor="bbffbb"
| 146 || September 11 || Cardinals || 2–1 || Senzatela (9–10) || Hudson (15–7) || Díaz (3) || 31,931 || 62–84 || W2
|- align="center" bgcolor="ffbbbb"
| 147 || September 12 || Cardinals || 3–10 || Mikolas (9–13) || Melville (2–2) || || 27,618 || 62–85 || L1
|- align="center" bgcolor="bbffbb"
| 148 || September 13 || Padres || 10–8 || Hoffman (2–6) || Lucchesi (10–8)|| Díaz (4) || 31,654 || 63–85 || W1
|- align="center" bgcolor="bbffbb"
| 149 || September 14 || Padres || 11–10 || Lambert (3–6) || Lauer (8–9) || Tinoco (1) || 47,370 || 64–85 || W2
|- align="center" bgcolor="bbffbb"
| 150 || September 15 || Padres || 10–5 || Howard (1–0) || Quantrill (6–8) || || 30,699 || 65–85 || W3
|- align="center" bgcolor="bbffbb"
| 151 || September 16 || Mets || 9–4 || Senzatela (10–10) || Matz (10–9) || || 28,505 || 66–85 || W4
|- align="center" bgcolor="ffbbbb"
| 152 || September 17 || Mets || 1–6 || Stroman (9–13) || Melville (2–3) || || 33,118 || 66–86 || L1
|- align="center" bgcolor="ffbbbb"
| 153 || September 18 || Mets || 4–7 || Lugo (7–4) || Díaz (5–4) || || 30,174 || 66–87 || L2
|- align="center" bgcolor="ffbbbb"
| 154 || September 20 || @ Dodgers || 5–12 || Kershaw (15–5) || Lambert (3–7) || || 53,704 || 66–88 || L3
|- align="center" bgcolor="bbffbb"
| 155 || September 21 || @ Dodgers || 4–2 || Gonzalez (2–6) || Buehler (13–4) || Díaz (5) || 50,705 || 67–88 || W1
|- align="center" bgcolor="ffbbbb"
| 156 || September 22 || @ Dodgers || 4–7 || Ryu (13–5) || Senzatela (10–11) || || 47,948 || 67–89 || L1
|- align="center" bgcolor="bbffbb"
| 157 || September 24 || @ Giants || 8–5 (16) || Howard (2–0) || Rodríguez (6–10) || Shaw (1) || 27,870 || 68–89 || W1
|- align="center" bgcolor="ffbbbb"
| 158 || September 25 || @ Giants || 1–2 || Smith (6–0) || Johnson (0–2) || || 29,175 || 68–90 || L1
|- align="center" bgcolor="ffbbbb"
| 159 || September 26 || @ Giants || 3–8 || Coonrod (5–1) || Tinoco (0–3) || || 30,350 || 68–91 || L2
|- align="center" bgcolor="bbffbb"
| 160 || September 27 || Brewers || 11–7 || Senzatela (11–11) || Black (0–1) || — || 44,087 || 69–91 || W1
|- align="center" bgcolor="bbffbb"
| 161 || September 28 || Brewers || 3–2  || Díaz (6–4) || Albers (8–6) || — || 47,381 || 70–91 || W2
|- align="center" bgcolor="bbffbb"
| 162 || September 29 || Brewers || 4–3  || Shaw (3–2) || Faria (0–1) || — || 36,771 || 71–91 || W3
|-

|- style="text-align:center;"
| Legend:       = Win       = Loss       = PostponementBold = Rockies team member

Roster

Statistics

Batting
List does not include pitchers. Stats in bold are the team leaders.

Note: G = Games played; AB = At bats; R = Runs; H = Hits; 2B = Doubles; 3B = Triples; HR = Home runs; RBI = Runs batted in; BB = Walks; SO = Strikeouts;  AVG = Batting average; OBP = On-base percentage; SLG = Slugging percentage; OPS = On Base + Slugging

Pitching
List does not include position players. Stats in bold are the team leaders.

Note: W = Wins; L = Losses; ERA = Earned run average; G = Games pitched; GS = Games started; SV = Saves; IP = Innings pitched; R = Runs allowed; ER = Earned runs allowed; BB = Walks allowed; K = Strikeouts

Farm system

References

External links
2019 Colorado Rockies season Official Site
2019 Colorado Rockies season at Baseball Reference

Colorado Rockies seasons
Colorado Rockies
Colorado Rockies
2010s in Denver